Harry Mattick (born 20 December 1993) is an English figure skater. He is the 2017 Sofia Trophy champion, the 2020 Tayside Trophy bronze medalist, the 2012 British national silver medalist, and a three-time British national bronze medalist (2014, 2018, 2019).

On the junior level, he is the 2011 Warsaw Cup champion, the 2010 MNNT Cup bronze medalist, and a four-time British junior national champion (2008-2011).

Since the 2020-21 figure skating season, Mattick has competed in pair skating with Lydia Smart.

Programs

Results

Pairs with Smart

Singles
CS: Challenger Series; JGP: Junior Grand Prix

References

External links 

 
 Harry Mattick at Tracings

British male single skaters
1993 births
Living people
Sportspeople from Bradford